Cusiala raptaria is a moth of the family Geometridae first described by Francis Walker in 1860. It is found in the Indian subregion and Sri Lanka.

The caterpillar is a pest of several crops such as Albizia procera, Carissa spinarum, Cassia fistula, Dalbergia sissoo, Eugenia cumini, Lannea coromandelica, Mallotus philippensis, Schleichera oleosa, Shorea robusta, Syzygium cumini and Xylia xylocarpa.

References

Moths of Asia
Moths described in 1860